The 2015 NCAA Division I women's soccer season was the 34th season of NCAA championship women's college soccer. The Florida State Seminoles were the defending national champions.

Season overview

Standings

See also 
 College soccer
 List of NCAA Division I women's soccer programs
 2015 in American soccer
 2015 NCAA Division I Women's Soccer Tournament
 2015 NCAA Division I men's soccer season

References 

 
NCAA, Women